Walter Harvie (18 June 1891 – 24 May 1969) was a New Zealand cricketer. He played two first-class matches for Auckland in 1914/15.

He captained a New Zealand team, consisting mostly of players from Auckland, on a tour of Fiji in March and April 1924. The team played five matches, including two three-day matches against Fiji. None of the matches were first-class.

See also
 List of Auckland representative cricketers

References

External links
 

1891 births
1969 deaths
New Zealand cricketers
Auckland cricketers
Cricketers from Auckland